Oreina is a genus of broad-shouldered leaf beetles belonging to the family Chrysomelidae, subfamily Chrysomelinae.

Species
 Oreina alpestris
 Oreina bidentata
 Oreina bifrons
 Oreina cacaliae
 Oreina coerulea
 Oreina elongata
 Oreina frigida
 Oreina genei
 Oreina gloriosa
 Oreina intricata
 Oreina liturata
 Oreina ludovicae
 Oreina melancholica
 Oreina peirolerii
 Oreina plagiata
 Oreina speciosa
 Oreina speciosissima
 Oreina splendidula
 Oreina virgulata
 Oreina viridis
 Oreina vittigera

References
 Bontems, C., 1981 - Les especes de Linne et Fabricius du genre Oreina Chevrolat, 1837 (Col. Chrysomelidae, Chrysomelinae) - Nouv. Rev. Ent. 11: 93-109

External links
 Biolib
 Biol.uni
 Fauna Europaea

Chrysomelinae
Beetles of Europe
Chrysomelidae genera
Taxa named by Louis Alexandre Auguste Chevrolat